The Detroit Emeralds are an American R&B/soul vocal group, best known in the early 1970s. They enjoyed a run of successful records in the decade including their 1973 transatlantic hit single, "Feel the Need in Me".

Career
"The Emeralds" were formed as a vocal harmony group in Little Rock, Arkansas, and originally composed of four brothers, Ivory (September 14, 1941 – September 13, 2014), Abrim (January 12, 1945 – July 6, 1982), Cleophus and Raymond Tilmon. After Cleophus and Raymond left, the remaining Tilmon brothers were joined by childhood friend, James Mitchell. Moving to Detroit, Michigan, and expanding their name to the Detroit Emeralds, the trio had their first R&B chart success on Ric-Tic Records, with "Show Time" in 1968.

In 1970, they joined another Detroit-based label, Westbound Records. When touring in Memphis, Tennessee, they recorded some demo tracks at the Hi recording studios, run by top producer Willie Mitchell, to which they added vocals and strings back in Detroit. This approach worked and brought them another hit, "If I Lose Your Love", which was followed by a run of successes including "Do Me Right", "You Want It, You Got It", and "Baby Let Me Take You (In My Arms)" which all made the US R&B top 10, while the latter also reached number 24 on the US Billboard Hot 100 pop chart in 1972.

The song for which they are now best remembered, "Feel the Need in Me", reached number 22 US R&B in 1973, and a new longer version four years later also charted. The original track made the top five in the UK Singles Chart in 1973, and the later production also made the UK chart in 1977 (number 12). "You Want It You Got It" was re-released in the UK as a follow-up to the initial "Feel the Need in Me", also reaching the UK top 20 in 1973. Abrim Tilmon wrote all of their hits, while also arranging and producing the tracks. The horns and strings were arranged by the Grammy award-winning arranger, Johnny Allen. The horns and strings were recorded in Detroit with Carl Austin as concertmaster and Johnny Trudell leading the horns.

By 1974, the group was falling apart and, at one point, there were two outfits using the name. Abe Tilmon formed one new group using the Detroit Emeralds' name, whilst James Mitchell, along with Marvin Willis, wrote for another group, the Floaters – Paul Mitchell of the Floaters being James's brother. James Mitchell, Ivory Tilmon and Marvin Willis continued touring as the Detroit Emeralds and stayed active on the oldies and cabaret circuit for some years.

Abrim Tilmon died on July 6, 1982, at the age of 37, in his Southfield, Michigan, home of a heart attack. It was said a reunion of the group was being planned at the time. He was survived by his wife Janyce, son Steve, and daughter Cathy.

In 2019, the Detroit Emeralds was reformed by the group's founding member James Mitchell Jr. along with new members LaVel Jackson, Eddie Cameron and Dewayne Loc Lomax. They released a new single titled "Call Me, I'm Ready" in May 2019. In August 2021, they released the single "Victory". In November 2021, they released another single titled "Face 2 Face". In October 2022, they released another single titled "In My Life".

Discography

Studio albums

Compilation albums
Abe, James and Ivory (1973, Westbound)
Greatest Hits (1998, Westbound)

Singles

See also
List of soul musicians
List of disco artists (S–Z)
List of Soul Train episodes
Music of Michigan

References

External links
 
 
 The DETROIT EMERALDS singing "SHOWTIME" their first chart hit (1968)

African-American musical groups
American soul musical groups
Musical groups from Detroit
Ric-Tic Records artists
1960s establishments in Michigan